The Cloud Girls are comedians Jennifer Carnovale and Madeleine Culp, also known as carnovale & culp. They regularly perform at comedy festivals such as the Melbourne Fringe Festival and at stand-up rooms in Sydney and Melbourne. Jennifer and Madeleine also appear on Australian youth radio station Triple J where they present a segment during Sam Simmons' weekend breakfast program and were in ABC Comedy's "The Urban Monkey".

History 
Jennifer and Madeleine met in their senior years at an arts high school and it was soon decided that their comedy styles work well together. After numerous comedy and variety nights the girls decided that they could write their own show, resulting in "How To Be A Cloud and Other Life Lessons" (2006). This is where their nickname "The Cloud Girls" originated from. Their first comedy festival was Adelaide Fringe Festival in 2007. Since then they have performed at Melbourne International Comedy Festival and Sydney Comedy Festival. Since 7 July 2008, the Cloud Girls frequently host their own show on Triple J's mid-dawn shift (1 a.m. – 6 a.m.), usually on Thursday morning. During summer 2010 they hosted the weekday evenings program on Triple J from 6 p.m. – 10 p.m., called Summer Nights. The show is a mixture of requests, summer party tunes and discussion. The duo won Sydney Comedy Festival's Best Newcomer Award for their 2010 show "The Cloud Girls in World".

Triple J announcers
Australian comedy troupes
Australian women comedians
Australian women radio presenters